The Shershen-L light antitank guided missile system is intended for defeat of stationary and moving modern armored targets with combined, distributed, or solid armor, including ERA, as well as small-sized targets, like pillbox, tank in trench, light armored objects, and helicopters.

Initially, the Shershen-L ATGM system was designed for launching of a missile and aiming to the target without support for launcher (from shoulder of the operator). However, the analysis of Shershen-L firing trials and practice of combat application of similar light ATGM systems discovered, that launchers with support ensure better firing accuracy. That is why the new variant of Shershen-L has been developed in configuration with tripod for launcher plus small-sized control panel for remote control of missile guidance, that guarantees safety of the operator. Shershen-L may be also mounted on different types of mobile platform like light armored vehicles, jeeps, baggies, light vessels, etc.

Specifications

References

Anti-tank guided missiles